National Weather Service - Memphis, TN is a local weather forecast office responsible for monitoring weather conditions in the U.S. Mid-South region for counties in Eastern Arkansas, the Missouri Bootheel (Dunklin and Pemiscot counties), Northern Mississippi, and Western Tennessee. The current office in Memphis maintains a WSR-88D (NEXRAD) radar system, and Advanced Weather Interactive Processing System (AWIPS) that greatly improve forecasting in the region. Memphis is in charge of weather forecasts, warnings and local statements as well as aviation weather. The name of the Doppler radar (WSR-88D) used by this office is MEG. Jim Belles is the Meteorologist-In-Charge (MIC) of this office.

External links
 Official Website

Memphis, Tennessee